Area code 845 is a telephone area code in the North American Numbering Plan (NANP) for the U.S. state of New York. The numbering plan area comprises the mid- and lower Hudson Valley, specifically Orange, Putnam, Rockland, and Ulster counties, and parts of Columbia, Delaware, Dutchess, Greene, and Sullivan counties. The area code was created on June 5, 2000, by an area code split from most of the territory of area code 914, which was retained by Westchester County.

Prior to October 2021, area code 845 had telephone numbers assigned for the central office code 988. In 2020, 988 was designated nationwide as a dialing code for the National Suicide Prevention Lifeline, which created a conflict for exchanges that permit seven-digit dialing. This area code was therefore scheduled to transition to ten-digit dialing by October 24, 2021.

In April 2022, the North American Numbering Plan Administrator (NANPA) announced a new area code, 329, was scheduled to overlay 845 on March 24, 2023.

Service area
Numbering plan area 845 includes the following communities.

Airmont
Beacon
Beekman
Blauvelt
Brewster
Carmel
Chester
Chestnut Ridge
Clarkstown
Clinton Corners
Congers
Cornwall
Cold Spring
Cottekill
Crawford
Dover Plains
East Fishkill
Fishkill
Fleischmanns
Garrison
Goshen
Halcott
Haverstraw
High Falls
Highland
Hopewell Junction
Hyde Park
Jeffersonville
Kingston
LaGrange
Liberty
Mahopac
Margaretville
Middletown
Millbrook
Monroe
Monsey
Montebello
Monticello
Montgomery
Nanuet
Nelsonville
Newburgh
New City
New Paltz
New Windsor
Nyack
Olive
Orangetown
Patterson
Pawling
Pearl River
Phoenicia
Piermont
Pleasant Valley
Pine Bush
Pomona
Port Jervis
Poughkeepsie
Red Hook
Rhinebeck
Rosendale
Saugerties
Sloatsburg
Spring Valley
Staatsburg
Stone Ridge
Stony Point
Suffern
Tappan
Valley Cottage
Walden
Wallkill
Wappingers Falls
Warwick
Washingtonville
Wingdale
West Nyack
West Point
Woodbury
Woodstock

References

External links

845
845
Rockland County, New York